West Air Sweden Flight 294 was a cargo flight of a Canadair CRJ200 from Oslo to Tromsø, Norway that crashed on 8 January 2016. A malfunction in one of the inertial reference units had produced erroneous attitude indications on one of the instrument displays. The crew's subsequent response resulted in spatial disorientation, leading to the loss of control of the aircraft. Both crew members on board were killed.

Aircraft and crew
The aircraft was built in 1993 and was operated by Lufthansa CityLine as D‑ACLE until the end of 2006. It had a manufacturer's serial number (MSN) of 7010 and had two General Electric CF34-3B1 engines. The aircraft then underwent a cargo conversion, being re‑designated as a CRJ200-PF (Package Freighter). The aircraft had been operated by West Air Sweden since 2007 as SE‑DUX. At the time of the crash, it had accumulated more than 38,600 flight hours and 31,000 flight cycles.

The 42‑year‑old Spanish captain had around 3,200 flying hours, of which 2,016 were on this aircraft type; the 33‑year‑old French first officer had 3,050 flying hours, of which 900 were on this aircraft type.

Flight

The aircraft departed Oslo-Gardermoen Airport at 23:11 hours local time for a flight to Tromsø Airport. The aircraft carried  of mail. The aircraft was in cruise at flight level 330 (nominal ) before the aircraft transmitted a Mayday call at approximately 23:31, after which communications and radar contact with the flight were lost by air traffic control.

Search
Both Norwegian and Swedish authorities searched for the aircraft, discovering the wreckage at 03:10 in the morning.

Investigation

The Swedish Accident Investigation Authority (or SHK) opened an investigation into the crash. On 9 January 2016, the flight data recorder (FDR) was found severely damaged as well as parts of the Cockpit Voice Recorder (CVR). The CVR was, however, not intact, and the part containing the memory functions was missing. The following day, the missing parts of the CVR were found, alongside human remains. On 12 January, SHK reported that the distress call from the pilots contained the word "Mayday" repeated, with no further information. On 26 January, Statens Haverikommission reported that they had managed to read both CVR and FDR, and were analysing and validating the recordings.

On 19 March, in their interim report, SHK revealed:
After 17 seconds from the start of the event, the maximum speed (VMO) of 315 knots was exceeded. The overspeed warning was activated and the vertical acceleration turned to positive values.

Another 16 seconds later, the first officer transmitted a "MAYDAY" message that was confirmed by air traffic control. The indicated airspeed then exceeded 400 knots and the stabilizer trim was reactivated and reduced to 0.3 degrees nose down. The Pilot in Command called "Mach trim" after which engine power was reduced to idle.

During the further event, the last valid FDR value shows that the speed continued to increase up to 508 knots while the vertical acceleration values were positive, with maximum values of approximately +3G.
FDR data shows that the aircraft's ailerons and spoilerons mainly were deflected to the left during the event.

The final report was published by SHK on 12 December 2016. The inquiry reached the following conclusion:
The accident was caused by insufficient operational prerequisites for the management of a failure in a redundant system.
Contributing factors were:
The absence of an effective system for communication in abnormal and emergency situations.
The flight instrument system provided insufficient guidance about malfunctions that occurred.
The initial manoeuver that resulted in negative G-load probably affected the pilots' ability to manage the situation in a rational manner.

In popular culture 
The accident is featured in the second episode of Season 20 of Mayday, also known as Air Crash Investigation. The episode is titled "Impossible Pitch".

See also
Spatial disorientation

References

2016 in Norway
2016 in Sweden
Aviation accidents and incidents in 2016
Aviation accidents and incidents in Sweden
January 2016 events in Europe
Norrbotten County
Airliner accidents and incidents caused by pilot error
Airliner accidents and incidents caused by instrument failure
Accidents and incidents involving the Bombardier CRJ200
Accidents and incidents involving cargo aircraft
2016 disasters in Sweden